Matrix Chambers is a barristers' chambers in Gray's Inn London, Brussels, and Geneva. Founded in April 2000 by 22 barristers from 7 different chambers, it now has over 90 independent and specialist lawyers who work throughout the UK and internationally. Matrix focuses on criminal law, constitutional law and human rights.

History
Matrix was founded shortly before the implementation of the Human Rights Act in October 2000. The Independent reported that the chambers "was being set up with many of the leading and most high-profile barristers in the area of human rights – who had all been headhunted."

Members include: Lord Brennan KC, Professor Conor Gearty, Lord Ken Macdonald KC, Clare Montgomery KC, Tim Owen KC, Philippe Sands KC, Hugh Tomlinson KC, Professor Takis Tridimas, Ben Silverstone, Helen Mountfield KC, and Alex Bailin KC.

Practice areas
 Commercial Law
 Competition and EU
 Crime
 Employment Law
 International Arbitration
 Investigations 
 Media and Information Law
 Public International Law
 Public Law

References

External links
 

Barristers' chambers in the United Kingdom
2000 establishments in the United Kingdom
Law firms based in London